Zaar may refer to:

 Zār, or Zaar, a demon or spirit in the cultures of the Horn of Africa and adjacent regions of the Middle East
 Daniel Zaar (born 1994), Swedish ice hockey player 
 Zaar Randeri or Zar Randeri, the pen name of Bharucha Hasim bin Yusuf, Gujarati poet and translator
 Zaar, a fictional element in Future Robot Daltanious
 "Zaar," a song by Peter Gabriel from the 1989 album Passion
 Zaar languages, or Zaar group of South Bauchi languages
 Zaar language, or Saya language

See also 

 Zar (disambiguation)